The 2002 Frankfurt Galaxy season was the tenth season for the franchise in the NFL Europe League (NFLEL). The team was led by head coach Doug Graber in his second year, and played its home games at Waldstadion in Frankfurt, Germany. They finished the regular season in third place with a record of six wins and four losses.

Offseason

Free agent draft

Personnel

Staff

Roster

Standings

References

Frankfurt
Frankfurt Galaxy seasons